Amanda Phingbodhipakkiya (born 1992) is a multidisciplinary artist and speaker based in Brooklyn, New York. She is behind the project Beyond Curie. Phingbodhipakkiya is a neuroscientist-turned-artist and an advocate of STEM who is known for conveying complex scientific ideas via art.

Early life 
Phingbodhipakkiya was born and raised in the outskirts of Atlanta to Thai and Indonesian immigrant parents.

Education and career
Phingbodhipakkiya earned a bachelor's degree in neuroscience from Columbia University in 2010. She worked as a researcher at Columbia Medical Center and conducted a study regarding Alzheimer's disease. After obtaining a master's degree in Communication Design from Pratt Institute, she worked as a creative for several companies until she established her own career and went full-time as a multidisciplinary artist.

Phingbodhipakkiya had written and presented content about neuroscience for both Inc. and TED. She also writes occasionally at Medium. Phingbodhipakkiya works as an artist-in-residence for NYC Commission of Human Rights.

Change in career

At a young age, Phingbodhipakkiya associated and questioned the relationship between science and art. As a child, she was fascinated by the aesthetic appeal of the wings of a butterfly, and her mother decided to buy a microscope so she could better observe them. Phingbodhipakkiya then pondered how art, design, and science are interconnected and wondered how they are seen as completely separate and different fields in education.

As an adult, from a neuroscientist, Phingbodhipakkiya eventually became an artist. When asked how she made the jump, Phingbodhipakkiya recalled an incident when she used to work for Columbia Medical Center: a patient once asked her what is her contribution to science. She gave the research paper in response and later regretted it because the average person would not be interested in reading dense scientific papers and therefore would not understand.

Phingnodhipakkiya pondered how to become a better storyteller by expressing complex ideas to a wider audience in a digestible way, and she found herself delving into design.

Artistic work

Phingbodhipakkiya is a multidisciplinary artist and has utilized augmented reality, interactive installation and biodesign on her projects and exhibits. She is open on trying out various mediums to express the subject matter.

Phingbodhipakkiya's art is usually colorful and she considers space to be a vital aspect in her craft. She cites artist Bruno Munari as her inspiration as she is fascinated by how he pairs colors and shapes.

Projects

Beyond Curie - a portrait series that highlights unsung women with significant contributions to Science, Technology, Engineering and Mathematics.
The Leading Strand - A collaboration between scientists and artists to translate and convey scientific breakthroughs into visual art.
Community of Microbes - in partnership with biologist Anne Madden, the project explores the world of microorganisms through sculpture and interactive AR installation.
Findings - a mural series held across the United States that hails women in science.
Connective Tissue - Phingbodhipakkiya's solo exhibition features large-scale murals and interactive installations. The project demonstrates the importance and impact of networks and connections—whether biologically, scientifically and/or socially.
ATOMIC by Design - a fashion line inspired by 118 elements of the periodic table.
Powers of X (in progress) - it explores the remarkable contributions of women in mathematics and translates it into visual art.
Particle 17 (in progress) - an interactive and immersive project that aims to convey the world of quantum physics, especially subatomic particles.
"I Still Believe in Our City" - a public art installation mounted as an ad takeover at the Atlantic Avenue subway station in Brooklyn, NY as part of Phingbodhipakkiya's appointment as the artist-in-residence at the NYC Human Rights Commission. The piece includes a series of 45 panels featuring bright portraits of Black, East Asian, and Southeast Asian residents of the city alongside antidiscriminatory messages such as "I Am Not Your Scapegoat"
"With Softness and Power" - an illustration selected for the cover of TIME Magazine's March 29, 2021 issue, showing a central figure surrounded by flowers that offers hope as well as a call to action in response to hate crimes against the Asian American and Pacific Islander community in the United States

Gallery
Beyond Curie

2020 NYC Public Artists in Residence (PAIR) images from NYC.gov

Awards and recognition
26 Emerging Asian American Voices, NBC, 2020
Most Innovative Product, Beyond Curie, Fast Company, 2019
GOLD International Design Award (Interactive Media), Beyond Curie, 11th IDA, 2018
WeWork Creator Award, WeWork, 2017
Red Dot Design Award, Red Dot, 2017
TED Residency, TED Conferences, 2016

References 

1992 births
Living people
21st-century American women artists
21st-century American painters
American women painters
Columbia College (New York) alumni
Pratt Institute alumni
American artists of Asian descent
American people of Thai descent